Thomas Beadle (born March 22, 1987) is an American politician from the state of North Dakota. A Republican, he is the North Dakota State Treasurer. Beadle was previously a member of the North Dakota House of Representatives.

Career
Beadle graduated from Concordia College. He has worked as a realtor and business manager of a graphic design firm.

Beadle was first elected to the North Dakota House of Representatives in 2010, succeeding Lee Myxter, who did not run for reelection to run for a seat in the North Dakota Senate.

Beadle ran for North Dakota State Treasurer in the 2020 elections. He faced Daniel Johnston for the Republican Party nomination for state treasurer in the primary election. Beadle defeated Johnston, and won the general election in November, defeating Democrat Mark Haugen with 66% of the vote. He was sworn in as state treasurer on January 1.

Personal life
His grandfather is Earl Strinden, a former majority leader of the North Dakota House. His aunt, Michelle Strinden, also serves in the North Dakota House, and his stepfather, Tony Grindberg, is a former member of the North Dakota Senate.

References

External links

1987 births
Concordia College (Moorhead, Minnesota) alumni
Living people
Republican Party members of the North Dakota House of Representatives
State treasurers of North Dakota
Politicians from Fargo, North Dakota
Politicians from Nashville, Tennessee
21st-century American politicians